The 2017 Eastern Illinois Panthers football team represented Eastern Illinois University as a member of the Ohio Valley Conference (OVC) during the 2017 NCAA Division I FCS football season. Led by fourth-year head coach Kim Dameron, the Panthers compiled an overall record of 6–5 overall with a mark of 5–3 in conference play, placing third in the OVC. Eastern Illinois played home games at O'Brien Field in Charleston, Illinois.

Previous season
The Panthers finished the 2016 season 6–5, 4–4 in OVC play to finish in a tie for fifth place.

Schedule

Game summaries

at Indiana State

at Northern Illinois

Illinois State

Southeast Missouri State

at Tennessee State

Tennessee Tech

at Murray State

Jacksonville State

at UT Martin

Eastern Kentucky

at Austin Peay

References

Eastern Illinois
Eastern Illinois Panthers football seasons
Eastern Illinois Panthers football